Sir Rupert Mackeson, 2nd Baronet (born 16 November 1941) is a British author and former soldier.

Background and education

Mackeson is the son of Sir Harry Mackeson, 1st Baronet, and his wife Alethea Cecil Chetwynd-Talbot. His grandfather Henry Mackeson was the founder of the Mackeson brewery.

He was educated at Harrow School, Trinity College, Dublin and Sandhurst.

Career
After serving four years in the Royal Horse Guards, Mackeson began working in the City of London. When he left the army, Mackeson found employment running a London bank with strong ties to the Mafia, which Mackeson freely admits. "I ran a Mafia controlled financial institution," he declared in The Guardian. Since he "did not want to end up under Blackfriars Bridge," when the "aggravation" of running a "mobbed up" bank became too much for him, Mackeson relocated to Rhodesia (now Zimbabwe), which was then under the control of a white-minority government. There, Mackeson began a career in smuggling. In order to "curry favor with Mrs.Thatcher", the Rhodesian authorities arrested him and imprisoned him in the Khami prison camp. Within a day, Mackeson was removed from the prison for inciting a riot. When the Rhodesian authorities attempted to extradite him to the UK, Mackeson punched his guard in the nose while on board a plane, forcing the plane to land. When he was finally transported back to the UK, the judge presiding over the case ruled that it was an illegal extradition—a kidnapping, in essence—and had him freed.

Since release, Mackeson has become a writer of books about racing, writing under his own name and also as Rupert Collens. Bet Like a Man (2001) is a novel about the cloning of a Derby winner. He also writes for the Racing Post and runs a mobile bookshop and art gallery which operates on British racecourses.

Books as Rupert Mackeson
Great Racing Gambles and Frauds
Flat Racing Scams and Scandals (Metro Publishing, 2004) 
Bet Like a Man (Eye Ltd, Bridgnorth, 2001)

Books as Rupert Collens
50 Cheltenham Gold Cups
Cecil Aldin's Dogs and Hounds
25 Legal Luminaries from Vanity Fair
Snaffles: His Life and Works (with John Welcome)
Snaffles on Racing and Point to Pointing (with John Welcome)
Snaffles on Hunting (with John Welcome)

References

Kidd, Charles, and Williamson, David (editors): Debrett's Peerage and Baronetage (1990 edition) (New York: St Martin's Press, 1990)
Rupert Mackeson at Eye Books
Racing Diary: Mackeson, a man of many parts

R. v. Sir Rupert Mackeson (extradition)

1941 births
Living people
Alumni of Trinity College Dublin
Baronets in the Baronetage of the United Kingdom
English male journalists
English non-fiction writers
21st-century English novelists
Graduates of the Royal Military Academy Sandhurst
People educated at Harrow School
Royal Horse Guards officers
English male novelists
21st-century English male writers